A raft is a flat floating structure for travel over water.

Raft may also refer to:

Arts, entertainment, and media
Raft (band), a French band
Raft (novel), a  science fiction novel by Stephen Baxter
Raft (video game), a survival game developed by Redbeet Interactive and published by Axolot Games
The Raft (comics), a fictional prison in comic books published by Marvel
"The Raft" (short story), a horror short story by Stephen King 
The Raft, a fictional refugee flotilla in Neal Stephenson's novel Snow Crash

Computing and technology
Raft (computer science), a distributed consensus protocol
RaftLib, the Raft library for parallel processing with iostreams and compute kernels

Organizations
Remote Area Firefighting Team (RAFT), firefighting specialists
Resource Area for Teaching (RAFT), a nonprofit organization supplying materials and ideas to teachers

Science
RAFT (chemistry), reversible addition–fragmentation chain transfer
Lipid raft, a cholesterol-enriched microdomain in cell membranes
Raft spider, a European spider of the family Pisauridae

Other uses
Floating raft system, a type of design for the (underground) foundation of a building
George Raft (1901–1980), American film actor
Great Raft, a gigantic log jam in the Red River, Louisiana, U.S. 
Raft Island, a private island in Pierce County, Washington, U.S.
Rafting, a recreational activity utilizing a raft
Timber rafting, a method for transporting felled tree trunks

See also
 Raft River (disambiguation)